O 19, laid down as K XIX, was an  of the Royal Netherlands Navy that saw service during World War II. O 19, along with her sister ship , were the first submarines in the world to be equipped with a submarine snorkel that allowed the submarine to run its diesel engines while submerged.

Ship history

Commissioning
The submarine's keel was laid at the Wilton-Fijenoord shipyard in Rotterdam on 15 June 1936 as K XIX but was renamed O 19 at some point. The submarine was launched on 22 September 1938 and commissioned in the Dutch navy on 3 July 1939. After her commissioning the HNLMS O 19 was put into service by commander Lieutenant-on-sea 1 (LTZ 1) K. van Dongen on July 3, 1939, following a short training period. Three weeks later, on 25 July 1939, the new submarine was already on its way to the Dutch East Indies via the Suez Canal where the boat arrived on 13 September.

World War II
On 10 May 1940, the day the Germans invaded the Netherlands, the entire mobilization was proclaimed in the Dutch colony. Most Dutch warships, including the O 19, were used to protect allied merchant ships and to patrol the Indonesian archipelago. On May 31, 1941, the command of the Dutch submarine was taken over by LTZ 1 F.J.A. Knoops.

The submarine performed multiple patrols and missions in the Pacific theater of World War II, sinking multiple Japanese vessels, attacking shipping convoys and laying mines. 

On 8 July 1945, O 19 was en route to Subic Bay in the Philippines at a speed of  when it struck Ladd Reef in the South China Sea. Unable to pull free of the reef, the crew of O 19 were rescued by the U.S. Navy submarine . To prevent enemy capture, O 19 was scuttled by her crew and the Cod's crew using explosives, torpedoes and gunfire.

Design
The diesel engines for the HNLMS O 19 was built under the license of the Swiss Sulzer by the Koninklijke Maatschappij De Schelde in Vlissingen. It had 40mm Bofors machine guns, which could be stored in watertight compartments in front of and behind the command tower, just like the O 12-class submarines. The HNLMS O 19 was also equipped with noise pulses from Atlas Werke in Bremen, Germany, which at that time were considered the best in the world. In 1943, during a major maintenance period in Great Britain, the noise spanner of the HNLMS O 19 was replaced by an Asdic system of type 120B.

Summary of raiding history
Ships sunk by O 19.

References

Bibliography

External links
Video of USS Cod sinking O 19
IWM Interview with survivor Elke Scholte

1938 ships
Ships built by Wilton-Fijenoord
World War II submarines of the Netherlands
World War II shipwrecks in the Pacific Ocean
Lost submarines of the Netherlands
O 19-class submarines
Maritime incidents in July 1945